Statistics of Latvian Higher League in the 1932 season.

Overview
It was contested by 8 teams, and ASK won the championship.

League standings

ASK 3-1 Riga Wanderer

References
RSSSF

Latvian Higher League seasons
1
Latvia
Latvia